

First round

Source: Welsh Football Data Archive

Replay

Source: Welsh Football Data Archive

Second replay

Source: Welsh Football Data Archive

Oswestry receive a bye to the next round
Mold scratch to Druids
23rd Royal Welch Fusiliers scratch to Rhyl

Second round

Source: Welsh Football Data Archive

Replay

Source: Welsh Football Data Archive

Second replay

Source: Welsh Football Data Archive

Third round

Source: Welsh Football Data Archive

Replay

Source: Welsh Football Data Archive

Newtown White Star receive bye to semi final

Semi-final

Source: Welsh Football Data Archive

Ruthin receive bye to final

Final

References

Bibliography
 The History of the Welsh Cup 1877-1993 by Ian Garland (1991)

External links
 Welsh Football Data Archive

1879-80
1879–80 in Welsh football
1879–80 domestic association football cups